The Choyang T'an'gwang Line, or Choyang Colliery Line is an electrified railway line of the Korean State Railway in Kaech'ŏn city, South P'yŏngan Province, North Korea, running from Kaech'ŏn at the junction of the Kaech'ŏn and Manp'o Lines to Choyang Colliery.

History
The Choyang Colliery Line was opened on 13 May 1916 by the Mitsui Mining Railway, which became the Kaech'ŏn Light Railway  in 1927; the Kaech'ŏn Light Railway was subsequently taken over by the Chosen Government Railway on 1 November 1932.

Route 

A yellow background in the "Distance" box indicates that section of the line is not electrified.

References

Railway lines in North Korea
Standard gauge railways in North Korea
Railway lines opened in 1916